is a Japanese professional shogi player ranked 6-dan.

Early life
Kurosawa was born on March 7, 1992, in Kumagaya, Saitama. He learned how to play shogi at when he was elementary school first-grade student at a local children's center. In 2001, he finished runner-up in the 26th  as a fourth grader, and reached the semi-finals of the 27th Elementary School Student Meijin Tournament held the following year as a fifth grader. As a sixth grader in 2003. Kurosawa tied for third place at the 2nd , and later that same year entered the Japan Shogi Association's apprentice school at the rank of 6-kyū under the guidance of shogi professional Michio Takahashi.

Kurosawa was promoted to the rank of 3-dan in October 2010, and obtained full professional status and the rank of 4-dan in October 2014 after finishing tied for first in the 55th 3-dan League with a record of 13 wins and 5 losses.

Promotion history
The promotion history for Kurosawa is as follows:
 6-kyū: September 2003
 3-dan: October 2010
 4-dan: October 1, 2014
 5-dan: May 13, 2016
 6-dan: March 18, 2021

References

External links
ShogiHub: Professional Player Info · Kurosawa, Leo [sic]

Japanese shogi players
Living people
Professional shogi players
Professional shogi players from Saitama Prefecture
1992 births